Lamine Djaballah (born 4 July 1982) is a French professional footballer who currently plays as a striker for Championnat National 3 side FC Côte Bleue.

References
Lamine Djaballah profile at foot-national.com

1984 births
Living people
Footballers from Saint-Étienne
French footballers
Association football forwards
Gazélec Ajaccio players
CR Belouizdad players
Gap HAFC players
FC Libourne players
Amiens SC players
US Feurs players
Andrézieux-Bouthéon FC players
SC Toulon players
Ligue 2 players
Championnat National 2 players
Algerian footballers
French sportspeople of Algerian descent